Classic Christmas may refer to:
 Classic Christmas (Johnny Cash album), 1980
 Classic Christmas (Billy Gilman album), 2000
 Classic Christmas (George Strait album), 2008
 Classic Christmas (Bradley Joseph album), 2008
 Classic Christmas (Joe McElderry album), 2011
 A Classic Christmas (Wynonna Judd album), 2006
 A Classic Christmas (Toby Keith album), 2007